Call Me Claus is a 2001 American made-for-television Christmas comedy film directed by Peter Werner and starring Whoopi Goldberg and Nigel Hawthorne. The movie involves Santa Claus (Hawthorne) who needs a replacement Santa after serving his 200-year reign. He decides on Lucy Cullins (Whoopi Goldberg), an eccentric, grouchy shopping network executive, who hires him to promote Christmas decorations and presents on the network. The film had its premiere on TNT on December 2, 2001, and was also released on VHS and DVD by Columbia TriStar Home Entertainment. The film has since been reran on Lifetime, Freeform and The Hallmark Channel.

Plot

In 1965 Los Angeles, Lucy Cullins and her mother go to see a Santa Claus at a shopping mall, who happens to be the real one. Santa is nearing the end of his 200-year reign as St. Nick, and needs to find a replacement.

His search involves his hat and an elf assistant named Ralph (Taylor Negron). Nick puts the hat on every kid. If the hat glows, it means that person has the real Christmas spirit. When Lucy sits on his lap, he puts the hat on her and it glows brightly, proving she would make a perfect Santa Claus replacement. Unfortunately, after leaving the mall, Lucy receives news that her father had been killed, devastating her.

In 2001, Lucy forgotten about the Christmas spirit due to losing her father, and focuses more on her job than her family. Meanwhile, it is Nick's last Christmas as Santa, and he must find Lucy again. He locates her where she works as a network executive for the "Shop-A-Lot" Channel.

Lucy's boss (Brian Stokes Mitchell) wants a big sales boost for the holiday. He comes up with the idea of hiring someone dressed as Santa Claus to advertise Christmas memorabilia. Lucy holds many auditions with no luck. After nearly giving up hope, she sees Nick, who is jolly and obviously loves the season. Lucy hires him.

In Nick's first few days at work, calls come in big numbers and the network sells more Christmas stuff than any other shopping network. After congratulations and a salary raise, Nick couldn't be happier. He walks around the once-unpleasant community and begins to see the Christmas spirit for which he long hoped.

After a few days on the job, Nick cultures a close friendship with Lucy. He begins to tell her about his reign and his choosing her as a successor. He says if he doesn't find a successor, a giant flood will engulf the world, adding that that was the reason for the Noah's Ark story. Lucy finds it ridiculous and tries to stay away from him.

One night, Nick goes to her house and tells her truthfully about his search. He tells her to close her eyes. When she opens them, she finds herself with Nick at the North Pole. Unbelievably still unconvinced, Lucy demands Nick send her home. Nick does so, and she wakes up thinking the North Pole had been a dream. She sees Nick on the couch and starts to tell him about the dream. Nick interrupts her to tell her it wasn't, and begs her again to put on the Santa hat and become Santa Claus. She still says no.

Nick makes his final broadcast on Christmas Eve. In his closing statement, he says to never give up on Christmas spirit, and wishes everyone good luck. Lucy ponders why he says "good luck." After receiving a big thanks from the staff, Nick begins to head back to the North Pole without a successor and preparing for the flood with the elves. Before he leaves Los Angeles, he leaves the hat on Lucy's dresser, with a note that says it's never too late.

When Lucy gets a ride back home from her boss, she starts to believe what Nick said about Christmas, and her role as Santa. Realizing her boss just wants money and could own Christmas, Lucy tells him to pull over, saying that no one owns Christmas. At home, she sees Nick has gone. She finds the hat and the note. Curious, she puts the hat on and it glows brightly. She realizes that she really is Santa.

Back at the North Pole, they're preparing for the worst. Suddenly, one of the elves sees through a snow globe Lucy celebrating that she's Santa. Once Ralph hears about it, he and Nick go to pick up Lucy. Lucy runs out of her apartment and finds Ralph and Santa in the cab. She goes inside and transforms into Santa. Once she has her Santa suit, Nick doesn't have his. For the first couple of houses, Nick helps Lucy go down the chimney and deliver the toys. Before they continue, Lucy tells Ralph to stop the sled and go to a church, where her niece is performing in the choir. When she arrives, she catches her niece's solo, and congratulates her, her brother, and her mom. Seeing her Santa suit, they seem puzzled. Suddenly, it starts to snow in LA. With surprised faces, people run outside, and see the sleigh. Lucy's family begins to realize she is Santa. After Lucy says goodbye to everyone and her family, she, Nick and Ralph go up and away into the Christmas night.

Cast

See also
 Songs from Call Me Claus
 List of American films of 2001
 List of Christmas films
 Santa Claus in film

References

External links

2000s Christmas films
2001 television films
2001 films
American television films
American Christmas films
Christmas television films
Films about television
Films directed by Peter Werner
Films scored by Van Dyke Parks
Films set in 1965
Films set in 2001
Films set in Los Angeles
Santa Claus in film
Santa Claus in television